The 1967 Arkansas Razorbacks football team represented the University of Arkansas in the Southwest Conference (SWC) during the 1967 NCAA University Division football season. In their tenth year under head coach Frank Broyles, the Razorbacks compiled a 4–5–1 record (3–3–1 against SWC opponents), finished in fifth place in the SWC, and outscored all opponents by a combined total of 200 to 149.

Schedule

References

Arkansas
Arkansas Razorbacks football seasons
Arkansas Razorbacks football